This is a history of the 100 m backstroke world record as swum in both long-course (50 m; Olympic) pools and short-course (25 m) pools—the two categories recognized/tracked by FINA.

Men

Long course

Short course

Women

Long course

Short course

All-time top 25

Men long course
Correct as of June 2022

Notes
Below is a list of other times equal or superior to 52.76:
Thomas Ceccon also swam 51.93 (2022), 52.12 (2022), 52.21 (2022), 52.30 (2021), 52.49 (2021), 52.52 (2021).
Ryan Murphy also swam 51.94 (2018), 51.97 (2016, 2022), 52.19 (2018, 2021), 52.22 (2021), 52.24 (2021), 52.26 (2016), 52.28 (2016), 52.31 (2021), 52.33 (2021), 52.44 (2019), 52.46 (2022), 52.49 (2016), 52.51 (2018, 2022), 52.57 (2016), 52.59 (2017), 52.69 (2017), 52.70 (2018), 52.76 (2016).
Evgeny Rylov also swam 52.12 (2021), 52.44 (2019), 52.57 (2019), 52.66 (2018), 52.67 (2018, 2019), 52.74 (2016, 2018, 2021).
Kliment Kolesnikov also swam 52.13 (2021), 52.15 (2021), 52.24 (2021), 52.29 (2021), 52.32 (2021), 52.42 (2021), 52.44 (2021), 52.53 (2018), 52.63 (2021).
Matt Grevers also swam 52.16 (2012), 52.26 (2017), 52.48 (2017), 52.54 (2015), 52.55 (2015), 52.58 (2012), 52.64 (2016), 52.66 (2012, 2015), 52.71 (2017), 52.73 (2015), 52.75 (2015), 52.76 (2016).
Xu Jiayu also swam 52.17 (2019), 52.27 (2019), 52.31 (2016), 52.34 (2014, 2018), 52.37 (2020), 52.43 (2019), 52.44 (2017, 2017), 52.51 (2021), 52.60 (2017, 2018, 2020), 52.70 (2021), 52.72 (2018), 52.73 (2016), 52.75 (2016).
Aaron Peirsol also swam 52.19 (2009), 52.54 (2008).
Hunter Armstrong also swam 52.20 (2022), 52.37 (2022), 52.48 (2021), 52.67 (2021), 52.68 (2023).
Apostolos Christou also swam 52.24 (2022), 52.57 (2022).
Mitch Larkin also swam 52.26 (2015), 52.37 (2015), 52.38 (2015, 2019), 52.40 (2015), 52.41 (2015), 52.43 (2016), 52.48 (2015, 2016), 52.50 (2015), 52.54 (2016), 52.70 (2016), 52.75 (2020), 52.76 (2021).
David Plummer also swam 52.28 (2016), 52.40 (2016, 2016), 52.50 (2016), 52.51 (2015), 52.70 (2016).
Ryosuke Irie also swam 52.34 (2014), 52.45 (2014), 52.50 (2009, 2009), 52.53 (2018, 2018), 52.56 (2009), 52.57 (2014), 52.59 (2020), 52.60 (2009), 52.61 (2018), 52.62 (2009), 52.69 (2014), 52.73 (2009, 2009), 52.75 (2009), 52.76 (2009).
Junya Koga also swam 52.39 (2009).
Camille Lacourt also swam 52.44 (2011), 52.46 (2010), 52.48 (2015), 52.58 (2010), 52.70 (2015, 2016), 52.72 (2016), 52.75 (2012), 52.76 (2011).
Helge Meeuw also swam 52.46 (2009), 52.49 (2009), 52.54 (2009).
Aschwin Wildeboer also swam 52.64 (2009), 52.70 (2009), 52.76 (2009).
Shaine Casas also swam 52.72 (2019), 52.76 (2021).
Yohann Ndoye Brouard also swam 52.72 (2022).
Ksawery Masiuk also swam 52.75 (2022).

Men short course
Correct as of December 2022

Notes
Below is a list of other times equal or superior to 49.65:
Kliment Kolesnikov also swam 48.82 (2020), 48.90 (2017), 49.13 (2021), 49.46 (2021), 49.47 (2021), 49.57 (2021).
Evgeny Rylov also swam 48.94 (2021), 48.98 (2021), 49.58 (2021).
Coleman Stewart also swam 49.13 (2021), 49.62 (2021).
Ryan Murphy also swam 49.23 (2018), 49.29 (2020), 49.36 (2020), 49.49 (2021), 49.51 (2021), 49.61 (2021).
Shaine Casas also swam 49.23 (2021), 49.40 (2022), 49.54 (2022), 49.57 (2021).
Guilherme Guido also swam 49.29 (2021), 49.39 (2021), 49.40 (2020), 49.45 (2021), 49.59 (2020).
Lorenzo Mora also swam 49.37 (2022).
Mark Nikolaev also swam 49.40 (2021), 49.43 (2021), 49.65 (2021).
Robert Glință also swam 49.60 (2021).

Women long course
Correct as of June 2022

Notes
Below is a list of other times equal or superior to 58.92:
Kaylee McKeown also swam 57.47 (2021), 57.63 (2021), 57.84 (2023), 57.88 (2021), 57.93 (2020, 2023), 58.01 (2021), 58.11 (2020, 2021), 58.14 (2021), 58.31 (2022), 58.35 (2022), 58.42 (2021), 58.49 (2022), 58.52 (2020), 58.57 (2021), 58.60 (2021, 2022), 58.66 (2022), 58.69 (2021), 58.73 (2022), 58.77 (2022), 58.79 (2022), 58.84 (2020).
Regan Smith also swam 57.65 (2022), 57.76 (2022), 57.86 (2021), 57.92 (2021, 2023), 57.95 (2022), 57.96 (2021), 58.05 (2021, 2021), 58.18 (2020), 58.22 (2022), 58.26 (2020), 58.29 (2022), 58.31 (2022), 58.35 (2021, 2021), 58.40 (2022), 58.45 (2019), 58.55 (2019), 58.65 (2022), 58.68 (2019), 58.69 (2021), 58.77 (2021), 58.79 (2020), 58.81 (2021), 58.82 (2019), 58.83 (2018).
Kylie Masse also swam 57.72 (2021), 57.90 (2021), 58.09 (2021), 58.10 (2017), 58.13 (2021), 58.16 (2019), 58.17 (2021), 58.18 (2017), 58.19 (2019), 58.21 (2017), 58.29 (2018), 58.31 (2017), 58.39 (2022), 58.40 (2022), 58.41 (2022), 58.42 (2017), 58.48 (2021, 2022), 58.50 (2019), 58.54 (2018), 58.57 (2022, 2022), 58.60 (2019), 58.61 (2018), 58.62 (2017), 58.63 (2018, 2018), 58.66 (2016, 2018), 58.70 (2018), 58.73 (2022), 58.76 (2016), 58.77 (2016), 58.83 (2022), 58.86 (2017), 58.89 (2022), 58.91 (2019).
Kathleen Dawson also swam 58.24 (2021), 58.44 (2021), 58.49 (2021), 58.56 (2021), 58.65 (2021), 58.69 (2021), 58.70 (2021).
Emily Seebohm also swam 58.26 (2015), 58.34 (2015), 58.37 (2015), 58.39 (2012), 58.45 (2021), 58.51 (2015), 58.53 (2017), 58.56 (2015), 58.57 (2012), 58.59 (2015, 2017, 2021, 2021), 58.62 (2017), 58.66 (2018), 58.68 (2012), 58.70 (2015), 58.72 (2015, 2018), 58.73 (2016), 58.79 (2013, 2018), 58.81 (2015), 58.83 (2016), 58.84 (2014), 58.85 (2017), 58.86 (2021), 58.88 (2009, 2015, 2015), 58.89 (2015), 58.90 (2015, 2018), 58.91 (2015, 2015, 2018), 58.92 (2014).
Missy Franklin also swam 58.39 (2013), 58.42 (2013), 58.50 (2012), 58.67 (2013), 58.85 (2012).
Kathleen Baker also swam 58.41 (2018), 58.54 (2017), 58.56 (2020), 58.57 (2017), 58.58 (2017), 58.75 (2016), 58.77 (2018), 58.83 (2018), 58.84 (2016, 2016).
Rhyan White also swam 58.46 (2021), 58.59 (2022), 58.60 (2021), 58.88 (2021), 58.91 (2022).
Anastasia Fesikova also swam 58.48 (2009), 58.83 (2017).
Olivia Smoliga also swam 58.50 (2021), 58.72 (2021), 58.73 (2019), 58.75 (2018), 58.77 (2017), 58.79 (2019), 58.91 (2019).
Katharine Berkoff also swam 58.62 (2021), 58.82 (2021), 58.88 (2021).
Claire Curzan also swam 58.67 (2022), 58.73 (2022), 58.82 (2021).
Kira Toussaint also swam 58.73 (2021), 58.74 (2021), 58.91 (2020).
Gemma Spofforth also swam 58.74 (2009), 58.78 (2009).
Mie Nielsen also swam 58.75 (2016), 58.80 (2016), 58.84 (2015), 58.86 (2015).
Fu Yuanhui also swam 58.76 (2016).
Katinka Hosszú also swam 58.78 (2015), 58.80 (2017).
Aya Terakawa also swam 58.83 (2012), 58.84 (2013).
Taylor Ruck also swam 58.83 (2019).
Minna Atherton also swam 58.85 (2019).
Phoebe Bacon also swam 58.86 (2020).

Women short course
Correct as of December 2022

Notes
Below is a list of other times equal or superior to 55.97:
Minna Atherton also swam 55.09 (2019), 55.12 (2019), 55.29 (2019), 55.35 (2019), 55.43 (2019), 55.45 (2019), 55.55 (2019).
Kira Toussaint also swam 55.26 (2019), 55.42 (2021), 55.53 (2021), 55.58 (2019), 55.68 (2020), 55.71 (2019), 55.72 (2021), 55.74 (2019), 55.76 (2021), 55.79 (2021), 55.90 (2020), 55.92 (2018), 55.94 (2020), 55.95 (2021).
Katinka Hosszú also swam 55.34 (2014), 55.38 (2014), 55.42 (2015), 55.52 (2017), 55.54 (2016), 55.56 (2014), 55.59 (2016), 55.60 (2016), 55.65 (2017), 55.66 (2017), 55.70 (2014), 55.71 (2015), 55.77 (2014), 55.80 (2016), 55.93 (2016)).
Emily Seebohm also swam 55.46 (2015), 55.47 (2014), 55.81 (2018).
Olivia Smoliga also swam 55.47 (2018), 55.60 (2020), 55.62 (2020), 55.66 (2020), 55.86 (2018), 55.92 (2020), 55.97 (2019).
Ingrid Wilm also swam 55.68 (2021), 55.74 (2022), 55.92 (2022), 55.94 (2021).
Gao Chang also swam 55.72 (2009).
Kylie Masse also swam 55.76 (2021), 55.83 (2021), 55.95 (2021).
Mollie O'Callaghan also swam 55.80 (2022).
Kaylee McKeown also swam 55.81 (2022).
Louise Hansson also swam 55.85 (2021), 55.89 (2022).
Beata Nelson also swam 55.90 (2022).
Katharine Berkoff also swam 55.92 (2021).
Natalie Coughlin also swam 55.97 (2011).

References

Backstroke 100 metres
World record progression 100 metres backstroke